Norman Akers is a Native American artist known for his landscape works that incorporate cultural, historical and contemporary visuals of Native American life. He is a member of the Osage Nation and currently teaches painting in the Department of Visual Art at the University of Kansas.

Biography 
Norman Akers was born in Fairfax, Oklahoma and is a part of the Osage Nation. In 1982, Akers received his BFA in Painting from the Kansas City Art Institute. The next year Akers received a certificate in Museum studies from the Institute of American Arts. In 1991, Akers received an MFA  from the University of Illinois.

Artistic process 
Akers's artwork is inspired by his background as a Native American and what it means culturally to be an Indian. He has stated that he interprets his art as a form of cultural expression that tie to his views politically and historically, while maintaining a contemporary form. The art often includes references to multiple perspectives or interpretations and how these ideas are used to identify spiritual places. Akers has specified that there is no certain physical place or destination, as it represents the spiritual origin these images bring him and relate to him culturally. Akers will use maps in his work, which he has described as an expression for spiritual connection to physical places he has yet discovered.

His work also takes inspiration from current mainstream ideas of "immigrants" and what it means to be "illegal" in the present day world and his desire to question these ideas.

Exhibitions

Group exhibitions 

 Stories From the Land, Mingenback Gallery and the Birger Sandzen Memorial Gallery, in Lindsborg, Kansas (February 11, 2019 – March 15, 2019)
 Revisions: Contemporary Native American Art, Snite Museum of Art, University of Notre Dame, Notre Dame, Indiana (February 2, 2019 - May 18, 2019)
 (RE)CLAIM: Indigenous Artist Reflect on Identity, Nelson Atkins Museum of Art, Kansas City, Missouri (December 14, 2018 - June 16, 2018)
 Art for a New Understanding Native Voices 1950's to Now, Crystal Bridges Museum of American Art, Bentonville, Arkansas (October 6, 2018 - January 7, 2019)
 In/Sight, Sherry Leedy Contemporary Art Museum, Kansas City, Missouri (September 7, 2018 - October 20, 2018)

Solo exhibitions 
 Norman Akers: Printed Borders, Phoenix Gallery Underground, Lawrence, KS (2019)
 Norman Akers: Contested Territories, Percolator Art Space, Lawrence, KS (2015)
 Survey, Mingenback Art Gallery, Bethany College, Lindsborg, KS (2013)

Permanent collections 
Birmingham Museum of Art, Birmingham, AL
Library of Congress, Print Collection, Washington DC
Arrowhead Stadium Art Collection, Kansas City, MO
 Armenia Eiteljorg Museum of American and Western Art, Indianapolis, IN
 Fine Arts Center, Eastern Wyoming College, Torrington, WY
 Denver Art Museum, Denver, CO
Nelson Atkins Museum of Art, Kansas City, MO

Further reading 
 Silvka, Kevin, “Re | Centering Indigenous arts in art education: Decolonizing identity politics, censorship, and home”, Journal of Cultural Research in Art Education, (Vol. 36 No 3 (2019)
 Lindberg, Melissa. "Poet Laureate Joy Harjo Visits the Print & Photographs Reading Room" image. Washington, DC. Library of Congress. (August 30, 2019) Website/Blog
 Hearn, David, “At the Nerman: Voices and Visions from the “Path of the Butterfly”, pg. 72 - 75, KC Studio, Kansas City, MO, (May/June Vol. XI, issue 3)
 Frese, David. “American Indian Artists Reflect on Identity in New Exhibit”, pg. 26 - 27, KC Studio, Kansas City, MO (November/December 2018 Vol. X, issue 6)
 Besaw, Mindy, Hopkins, Candice, Well-Off-Man, Manuela “Art for a New Understanding Native Voices 1950s to Now”, Crystal Bridges Museum of American Art, pg. 21, 136-137, University of Arkansas Press (2018)
 Earenfight, Phillip. “Re-Riding History: From the Southern Plains to the Matanzas Bay” pg. 23, 51, Carlisle, PA, The Trout Gallery, The Art Museum of Dickinson College. (2018)
 Brandenburg, John. "Artists Interpret Borders", The Oklahoman, Oklahoma City, OK.
 Heath, Jennifer. “Imaginary Maps: Expeditions to Uncover Apocryphal Unsubstantiated and Forbidden Places”, pg. 4-5, Baksun books &art, Boulder, CO. (2018)
 Powell, Jami C. "Creating an Osage Future: Art, Resistance, and Self Representation", pg. 53, 64-66, 71-73, 131-132, 258-265, University of North Carolina. (2018)
 Ahtone, Heather P. "Cultural Paradigms of Contemporary Indigenous Art: As Found in the Work of Shan Goshorn, Norman Akers, Marie Watt, and Joe Feddersen", pg. 69, 102-143, 233, 238- 239, University of Oklahoma. (2018)

See also 

 Visual arts by indigenous peoples of the Americas

References

External links
Oral History Interview with Norman Akers
Norman Akers Faculty profile at University of Kansas
Norman Akers Official Website

Native American artists
University of Kansas faculty
Osage people
University of Illinois alumni
Year of birth missing (living people)
Living people